Ulrich Ellison (born December 14, 1980) is an American singer, songwriter, guitarist and music producer from Austin, Texas. He is the founder of the group Ulrich Ellison and Tribe, which won the 2015 Austin Music Award for "Best Funk/Soul/Blues" live band.

Life and career 
Ellison was born and raised in Graz, Austria. He originally started on classical piano and got admitted to the Johann Josef Fux Konservatorium. His career as a guitarist started after moving to Vienna where he studied music at the University of Music and Performing Arts, Vienna, while playing for several Austrian pop and rock acts. In 2007 Ellison came to the United States on a Fulbright scholarship and studied jazz guitar at the Sarah and Ernest Butler School of Music at the University of Texas at Austin. In his two years as a US student he won three of the International Downbeat Awards in the category "Blues/Rock/Pop soloist, college winner". After graduation he became sideman for several notable Austin acts, including soul singer Nakia and Grammy-nominated singer Abra Moore. In 2010 he founded the Ulrich Ellison Trio and has since then progressed his sound in several formations and different lineups.

Awards and recognition 
 2008 Downbeat Student Award, Winner, "Blues/Rock/Pop Soloist"
 2009 Downbeat Student Award, listed for Outstanding Performance, "Blues/Rock/Pop Soloist"
 2010 Downbeat Award, "Blues/Rock/Pop Soloist", outstanding performance
 2014 Austin Music Award, "Best Funk/Soul/Blues" live band
 2015 Austin Music Award, "Best Funk/Soul/Blues" live band
 2015 Austin Music Award, "Best Guitar"

Discography
2007 Tales From The Kingdom Electric
2012 Lose Yourself
2014 Synergy
2015 Dreamchaser

Sources:

References

External links 

1980 births
Living people
American male singer-songwriters
American people of Austrian descent
University of Texas at Austin College of Fine Arts alumni
University of Music and Performing Arts Vienna alumni
Guitarists from Texas
Musicians from Austin, Texas
21st-century American singers
21st-century American guitarists
21st-century American male singers
Singer-songwriters from Texas